This partial list of city nicknames in Colorado includes some of the sobriquets, pseudonyms, and slogans that identify, or have identified, the cities and towns of the U.S. state of Colorado. City nicknames can help in establishing a civic identity, helping outsiders recognize a community or attracting people to a community because of its nickname; promote civic pride; and build community unity. Nicknames and slogans that successfully create a new community "ideology or myth" are also believed to have economic value. Their economic value is difficult to measure, but there are anecdotal reports of cities that have achieved substantial economic benefits by "branding" themselves by adopting new slogans.

Some unofficial nicknames are positive, while others are derisive. The unofficial nicknames listed here have been in use for a long time or have gained wide currency.

Nicknames by city

A

Alamosa – Gateway to the Great Sand Dunes
Alma – As High As You Can Get 
Arvada – Celery Capital of the World (historical)
Aspen – America's Canary City
Ault – A Unique Little Town
Aurora – Gateway to the Rockies

B
Berthoud – Garden Spot of Colorado
Black Hawk – City of Mills (historical)
Boulder – The People's Republic of Boulder
Breckenridge – The Kingdom of Breckenridge

C

Cañon City – Climate Capital of Colorado
Carbondale – Ultimate Rocky Mountain Hideout
Cedaredge – Southern Gateway to the Grand Mesa
Central City – Richest square mile on Earth (historical)
Colorado Springs
City of Millionaires (historical)
Little London
Newport in the Rockies  (historical)
The Springs
Creede – There is no night in Creede (historical)
Crested Butte
Colorado's Last Great Ski Town
Wildflower Capital of Colorado

D

Deer Trail – Home of the World's First Rodeo
Denver
The Mile-High City
Queen City of the Plains (historical)
Queen City of the West
Broncoville
Wall Street of the West
Cow Town
Dove Creek – Pinto Bean Capital of the World
Durango – Durango Rocks!

E

Edgewater – City of Choice

F

Fairplay – The Real South Park
Fort Collins
The Choice City
The Napa Valley of Beer
Fort Fun
FoCo
Fort Morgan
The Capital of the Plains
The City of Lights
Fruita – Home of Mike the Headless Chicken (historical)

G

Grand Junction
Colorado's Wine Country
River City
Greeley
City of Churches (historical)
Garden City of the West (historical)
Golden – Where the West Lives
Gunnison – Gun Rack or Gunniicicle—-it's cold

L

Leadville – Magic City
Limon – The Hub City of the Plains
Longmont
Longtucky
The Long Apple
Loveland
Gateway to the Rockies
The Sweetheart City
Lyons – Double Gateway to the Rockies (or Double Gateway to Rocky Mountain National Park)

M
Manitou Springs – Saratoga of the West

N

Nederland
Home of the Frozen Dead Guy
Ned

O
Ouray – Switzerland of America

P

Palisade – Peach Capital of Colorado
Pueblo
Home of Heroes
Pride City
Steel City of the West (historical)
Little Chicago

S

Severance – Where the geese fly and the bulls cry
Steamboat Springs
Ski Town USA
The Boat
Sterling – A Colorado treasure

T

Tarryall – Grab-all (historical)
Telluride – To-hell-you-ride (historical)

V
Victor – City of Gold Mines

W
Wheat Ridge – Carnation Capital of the World (historical)
Woodland Park – The City Above The Clouds

See also

Colorado
Outline of Colorado
Index of Colorado-related articles
Bibliography of Colorado
Colorado statistical areas
Front Range Urban Corridor
North Central Colorado Urban Area
South Central Colorado Urban Area
Geography of Colorado
History of Colorado
List of counties in Colorado
List of places in Colorado
List of census-designated places in Colorado
List of forts in Colorado
List of ghost towns in Colorado
List of mountain passes in Colorado
List of mountain peaks of Colorado
List of municipalities in Colorado
List of adjectivals and demonyms for Colorado cities
List of city nicknames in Colorado
List of post offices in Colorado
Protected areas of Colorado

References

External links

Colorado state government website
Colorado tourism website
History Colorado website

Colorado, List of city nicknames in
City nicknames in Colorado, List of